J.E.D. Productions Presents Big League Records Greatest Hits is a compilation of previously released material from American rap group 415 and its main performers Richie Rich and D-Loc.  The tracks are compiled from 415's only two releases (41Fivin and Nu Niggaz on Tha Blokkk), as well as the solo debut albums from Richie Rich (Don't Do It) and D-Loc (Split Personality).

Track listing

Sources
[ Allmusic link]

415 (group) albums
1999 greatest hits albums
Gangsta rap compilation albums